Highway 38 is a highway in the northeast portion of the Canadian province of Saskatchewan, connecting Kuroki to Chelan in the north; it passes through Kelvington, nicknamed Canada’s Hockey Factory. The main feature along this highway is access to Greenwater Lake Provincial Park. This is a primary highway is paved in its entirety and maintained by the provincial government.

Major attractions
Highway 38 hosts the following lakes, beaches, historical sites and buildings, and provincial parks:

 South end near Fishing Lake, Saskatchewan and two regional parks.
 Highway 38 bends outward to the west to circumnavigate around Little Nut Lake
 By driving east on a gravel road from this highway there is access to a regional park on Round Lake.
 The original Kelvington Canadian National Railway CN station, was constructed in 1922, has been declared a heritage property.
 Highway 38 bends outward to the east to circumnavigate around Greenwater Lake.
 Highway 38 provides access to Greenwater Lake Provincial Park Explore the three lakes within the park; Greenwater, Steiestol and Marean Lake. Tourists can discover the island on Greenwater Lake by hydro cycles, paddle boat, boat or canoe and tour the park in any season, and take in guided nature trails, bicycling, snowmobiling, or cross country skiing.  There are also nearby the 18-hole Greenhills Golf Course, as well as a rainbow trout stocked fishing area named Steiestol Lake within the park.

History
In 1999, Highways and Transportation Minister Judy Bradley announced that Highway 38 was to be improved.

Major intersections
From south to north:

References

External links
A document from Saskatchewan Highways and Transportation: Winter Highway Conditions
Saskatchewan Highways Website – Highway Numbering
Saskatchewan Road Map RV Itineraries
Big Things of Canada, A Celebration of Community Monuments of Canada
Greenwater Lake Provincial Park

038